Kesaram is a village and panchayat in Nizamabad district, Telangana, India. It falls under Dharpally  mandal.

References

Villages in Ranga Reddy district